Artistic gymnastics, for the 2013 Bolivarian Games, took place from 19 November to 22 November 2013.

Medal table
Key:

Medal summary

Men

Women

References

Events at the 2013 Bolivarian Games
Artistic gymnastics competitions
2013 in gymnastics
Gymnastics at the Bolivarian Games